Harold Frank Kress (June 26, 1913 – September 18, 1999) was an American film editor with more than fifty feature film credits; he also directed several feature films in the early 1950s. He won the Academy Award for Best Film Editing for How the West Was Won (1962) and again for The Towering Inferno (1974), and was nominated for four additional films; he is among the film editors most recognized by the Academy of Motion Picture Arts & Sciences. He also worked publicly to increase the recognition of editing as a component of Hollywood filmmaking.

Biography
Harold F. Kress was born in Pittsburgh, Pennsylvania. He was the son of Samuel Kress and Sophie Siegelman. The family moved to Los Angeles, where his father ran a restaurant in Hollywood. Kress was studying to become a lawyer at the University of California, Los Angeles until he unexpectedly received an opportunity from Irving Thalberg to work in the editing department at the Metro-Goldwyn-Mayer (MGM) film studio.

MGM years
He worked for three years as an uncredited assistant on The Good Earth (1937). His first credit was for Broadway Serenade (directed by Robert Z. Leonard-1939). In that same year Kress worked on four other films. In the words of Tony Sloman, "MGM was the glamour film factory, the Rolls-Royce of Hollywood, and they put a new movie into production every 10 days. Kress's six (sic) films of 1939 (including Richard Thorpe's The Adventures of Huckleberry Finn, as supervising editor) proved he could work well under pressure and was unfazed by glamour. In 1940 he went on to edit Andy Hardy Meets Debutante, one of Louis B. Mayer's favourite series episodes, Comrade X, starring the studio's pride and joy, the king of Hollywood himself, Clark Gable, and two extremely successful Jeanette MacDonald-Nelson Eddy vehicles titled Bitter Sweet and New Moon. The success of these films thrust Kress into the top rank of MGM feature editors."

Kress edited the 1942 film Random Harvest that was directed by Mervyn LeRoy. The film was nominated for seven Academy Awards and "was one of MGM's biggest hits in 1942—indeed, one of the biggest in the studio's history." 

Kress worked for thirty years at MGM. Although he directed a few documentaries and made a stab at directing features, his real niche was as an editor, where he was one of the most respected editors in the industry. Ronald Bergan noted that "working as he did in the commercial cinema, he was an adherent of the 'invisible cutting' and 'editing for continuity' school rather than the 'dynamic montage' techniques developed by early Russian cinema or the iconoclastic editing styles derived from the French New Wave."

Later films and involvement with the Motion Picture Editors Guild
One of the high points of his career came after he left MGM. This was the editing of The Towering Inferno (1974) with his son Carl Kress. In the words of Tony Sloman, "The Towering Inferno is superbly put together, its pyramidal star structure cleverly maintained throughout, its climax as the high-level water tanks flood the blazing glass tower genuinely riveting, but there is a single edit within that film which encapsulates the art, craft and skill of the professional editor. Fred Astaire has taken a spreadsheet-sized junk bond certificate from out of his briefcase and puts it folded into his inside pocket. Seamless, except you never see him fold the document. It's done - brilliantly on a cut, an edit that must have brought great satisfaction to whichever Kress wrought it, and a supreme example of great (and totally invisible) editing."

Kress had been selected as a member of the American Cinema Editors, had been elected to the board of the organization, and been elected to the presidency (1967–1968) of the Motion Picture Editors Guild by its membership. In 1992 he received the American Cinema Editors Career Achievement Award. He used the occasion to note that film editing had become better recognized over his career as a component of filmmaking: "'We wanted to get our names from the bottom of the crawl to the top, with the director, cinematographer and costume designer,' he said. And he achieved that." In his 1992 interview with Gabriella Oldham, Kress noted "When I was president of the union for two years, I fought for recognition for the editor. I started the fight to get editors' names raised up on the credits. Now we get screen credit, and some producers and directors give advertising credit too, but that took a long time. On those MGM lists, we usually were down at the bottom. Finally, we crawled up to the middle, then we got underneath the camera, then we got on top of the camera. We're the directors' best friends and the directors helped move us up."

Family
He was married to Zelda Raphael, and predeceased her. They had one son, Carl, who also became a film editor. After suffering from cancer for a number of years, Kress died in Palm Desert, California on September 18, 1999 at the age of 86.

Awards
Kress was nominated for the Academy Award for Best Film Editing for Dr. Jekyll and Mr. Hyde (1941), Mrs. Miniver (1942),  and The Yearling (1947). Kress won his first Academy Award for How the West Was Won (1962). He was nominated again for The Poseidon Adventure (1972), and would win again for the 1974 action film The Towering Inferno with son Carl Kress. Only a handful of editors have received more than Kress' six nominations and two Academy Awards.

He won the Eddie award of the American Cinema Editors for How the West Was Won (1962), and he was nominated for The Poseidon Adventure (1972) and The Towering Inferno (1974). In 1992 he received their Career Achievement Award.

Filmography
This filmography is based on the listing at the Internet Movie Database except as otherwise noted.

See also
List of film director and editor collaborations. From 1941 through 1954, Kress edited five films that were directed by Mervyn LeRoy. Random Harvest (1942) was nominated for Academy Awards both for best picture and for best directing. Madame Curie (1943) was nominated for best picture.

References

American film editors
Best Film Editing Academy Award winners
University of California, Los Angeles alumni
1913 births
1999 deaths
Artists from Pittsburgh
Artists from Los Angeles